Bold Conceptions is the debut album by Bob James. The album was recorded between August 13–15, 1962. The cover features a drawing of Bob James at the piano.

Track listing 
 "Moment's Notice" (John Coltrane, Ernie Wilkins) – 3:09
 "Nardis" (Miles Davis) – 5:30
 "The Night We Call It a Day" (Tom Adair, Matt Dennis) – 3:10
 "Trilogy" (James) – 6:42
 "Quest" (James) – 4:10
 "My Love" (Leonard Bernstein) – 5:14
 "Fly Me to the Moon" (Bart Howard) – 4:43
 "Birks' Works" (Dizzy Gillespie) – 4:36
 "Softly, as in a Morning Sunrise" (Oscar Hammerstein II, Sigmund Romberg) – 3:39
 "Ghost Riders in the Sky" (Stan Jones) – 3:29

Personnel 
 Bob James – piano
 Ron Brooks – bass
 Robert Pozar – drums

References

1963 debut albums
Bob James (musician) albums
Mercury Records albums
Albums produced by Quincy Jones